AirSols was a combined, joint command of Allied air units in the Solomon Islands campaign of World War II, from April 1943 to June 1944. It was subordinate to the Allied but U.S.-led Commander, South Pacific Area, itself part of Pacific Ocean Areas. AirSols superseded and absorbed the Cactus Air Force, which controlled Allied air units in the Solomons during 1942–43. AirSols was made up of United States Navy (USN), United States Marine Corps (USMC), the Royal New Zealand Air Force (RNZAF) and the Thirteenth Air Force, United States Army Air Forces (USAAF) forces.

The Allied fliers were opposed by the Japanese 11th Air Fleet and Fourth Air Army, based at Rabaul, New Britain.

"Commander, Aircraft, Solomons" (ComAirSols) directed the combat operations of all land-based air forces in the Solomons during the major Allied offensive of 1943–44, Operation Cartwheel. Discussing the initial command structure of AirSols, Marine Corps historians Henry I. Shaw and Douglas T. Kane, wrote:
Rear Admiral Charles P. Mason was the first officer to hold the title ComAirSols; he assumed command on 15 February 1943 at Guadalcanal. Actually, Mason took over a going concern, as he relieved Brigadier General Francis P. Mulcahy, who had controlled all aircraft stationed at the island during the final phase of its defense. Mulcahy, who became Mason's chief of staff, was also Commanding General, 2nd Marine Aircraft Wing. The fact that a general headed the staff of an admiral is perhaps the best indication of the multiservice nature of AirSols operations. Since Mason brought only a few officers with him to help run the new command with its enlarged scope of activity, he kept Mulcahy's veteran staff. Experience, not rank, seniority, or service, determined the assignments. Vice Admiral Aubrey W. Fitch, as Commander, Aircraft, South Pacific (ComAirSoPac), was Admiral Mason's immediate superior.

On 15 June 1944, AirSols was replaced by AirNorSols (Air North Solomons), which would have 40 squadrons (including 23 USMC squadrons). That same day, responsibility for Allied units west of 159° East Longitude and south of the Equator passed from POA to the South West Pacific Area (SWPA). However, seven USAAF squadrons in AirNorSols were transferred, as part of the Thirteenth Air Force, to the U.S. Far East Air Forces (SWPA) and eight USN and RNZAF squadrons were moved to garrison duty in South Pacific.

Subordinate units

USN
VB-11
VF-17

USMC
2nd Marine Aircraft Wing
Marine Aircraft Group 23
VMF-214
VMF-223

USAAF
 18th Fighter Group
 347th Fighter Group
 4th Reconnaissance Group
 5th Bombardment Group
 42nd Bombardment Group
 307th Bombardment Group
 419th Night Fighter Squadron

RNZAF
No. 1 (Islands) Group RNZAF
No. 14 Squadron RNZAF
No. 15 Squadron RNZAF

Commanders

 Rear Admiral Charles P. Mason, USN: February 15, 1943 -  April 1, 1943
 Rear Admiral Marc A. Mitscher, USN: April 1, 1943 - July 25, 1943
 Brigadier General Nathan Twining, USAF: July 25, 1943 - November 20, 1943
 Major General Ralph J. Mitchell, USMC: November 20, 1943 - March 15, 1944
 Major General Hubert R. Harmon, USAF: March 15, 1944 - April 20, 1944
 Brigadier General Field Harris, USMC: April 20, 1944 - May 31, 1944
 Brigadier General James T. Moore, USMC: May 31, 1944 - June 15, 1944

(A full list of commanders can be seen at James A. Winnefeld, Joint Air Operations: Pursuit of Unity in Command and Control, 1942–1991, 34, drawing on Sherrod, 1952.)

See also

 Pacific Ocean Areas
Thirteenth Air Force
 South West Pacific Area
Fifth Air Force
RAAF Command

References

Notes

Books

Web

 Account of U.S. Marine involvement in air war over Solomon Islands and Rabaul.

 Air War Against Japan, 1943–1945 (RAAF)
 The Pacific

Air units and formations of the United States Navy
Allied air commands of World War II
Military units and formations established in 1943
Military units and formations disestablished in 1944